Zane Lamprey (born April 2, 1972 in Syracuse, New York, United States) is a comedian, actor, editor, producer,  and writer for television and movies.

Personal life 
Lamprey grew up in Syracuse and attended SUNY Cortland, where he majored in fine arts and minored in theatre.

In 2008, Lamprey and then wife Jennifer Roa divorced. In 2012 he married Melissa (Mel) Schilling.

Career 
Early in his career he worked on several projects for Comedy Central, VH1 and Nickelodeon.  He was also a cast member on MTV's Damage Control and host of VH1's reality show Motormouth.

He is best known for hosting Three Sheets, which ran on MOJO HD from 2006 through 2008, Fine Living channel in 2009 and the Travel Channel in 2010. He also hosted Have Fork, Will Travel, which previously ran on Food Network, a show similar to Three Sheets focusing on local food and eating customs. The February/March 2009 of Mutineer Magazine featured an extensive interview with Zane Lamprey, which highlighted Lamprey's views of fine beverage and the evolution of Three Sheets. Zane Lamprey appeared on the April/May 2009 cover of Mutineer Magazine, which also featured an exclusive behind the scenes look at Three Sheets with photos from Lamprey's personal collection.

After Three Sheets, Zane Lamprey created Drinking Made Easy, a similar drinking and traveling show focused on American bars and drinks. Drinking Made Easy ran on AXS TV for three seasons and a total of 62 episodes until 2013. After the show's end, Zane and his loyal fans joined together to create a new crowd-funded travel and drinking show known as Chug. After raising $591,804, six hour-long episodes were created and was expected to be released in 2014.

Media projects

Three Sheets

Lamprey's first television project was an international travelogue/pub crawl series which initially aired on MOJO HD named Three Sheets. The format of the show featured Lamprey traveling abroad learning about the origin of regional drinks and their drinking customs.

After MOJO HD ceased operations and went off the air on December 1, 2008, Zane worked to find a network to pick up Three Sheets.  Several networks were approached about purchasing the series, including the successor to the MOJO HD network, the Screaming Flea Productions.
 
On December 16, 2008, Lamprey hosted a rally to generate awareness of Three Sheets in an attempt to garner interest from other networks. The rally took place in Los Angeles, California and attracted approximately 400 people. A second rally on December 18, 2008 in New York City brought around 700 people. The chairman of HDNet, Mark Cuban was in attendance at the New York rally and expressed interest in acquiring the show.

On May 2, 2009 Zane announced that the Fine Living Network (FLN) had purchased Three Sheets. Three Sheets was originally to begin airing on FLN on Friday May 29, 2009 at 11:00pm and 11:30pm, but delays in the closure of the deal resulted in the premiere of the first two episodes of the nineteen-episode season being pushed to June 5, 2009.

However, on June 2, 2009, Lamprey reported that the deal was still not complete. On June 22, FLN finally made the official announcement that Three Sheets would begin airing July 20, 2009 and would air new episodes each Monday with rerun episodes scheduled to run Tuesday through Friday. Lamprey said on his website that the likelihood of the show being picked up for a fifth season would depend on the ratings of Season 4, with a focus on the ratings of the premiere.

In October 2009, it was announced that FLN would be re-branded as Cooking Channel, with content similar to their sister channel Food Network. Three Sheets was canceled from the re-branded network and Lamprey again began the search for a new network. Lamprey did find a home for Three Sheets on the Travel Channel for a brief stint in 2010 when fans flooded the Travel Channel's official Facebook page with support for the show. After one month, Travel Channel dropped Three Sheets from its lineup.

In February 2011, Three Sheets again found a home on a new network with Spike TV. Spike aired the first seven episodes of the third season that originally aired on FLN, but no further episodes have been shown since. Despite being absent from the television network, Three Sheets was still listed on Spike TV's official website as late as November 2014.

References

1976 births
Living people
Male actors from Syracuse, New York
Writers from Syracuse, New York